The 1940–41 Irish Cup was the 61st edition of the premier knock-out cup competition in Northern Irish football. 

Belfast Celtic won the tournament for the 5th time, defeating Linfield 1–0 in the final at Windsor Park.

Results

First round

|}

Replay

|}

Quarter-finals

|}

Replay

|}

Semi-finals

|}

Replay

|}

Final

References

External links
 Northern Ireland Cup Finals. Rec.Sport.Soccer Statistics Foundation (RSSSF)

Irish Cup seasons
1940–41 domestic association football cups
1940–41 in Northern Ireland association football